"Carry On Wayward Son" is a song by American rock band Kansas, released from the band's fourth studio album Leftoverture (1976). Written by guitarist Kerry Livgren, the song became the band's first Top 40 single, reaching No. 11 on the US Billboard Hot 100 in early 1977.

The song has since remained a classic rock radio staple and a signature song for the band.

Background
While Kansas' previous three albums had split songwriting duties between lead vocalist Steve Walsh and band member Kerry Livgren, the latter essentially provided all the material for the band's fourth album release, Leftoverture. According to Livgren, "On the very first day of rehearsals, Steve...said that he had nothing – not a single song. I don't relish that kind of pressure, but with hindsight it really brought out the best in me." Although based in Atlanta, Kansas had returned to their Topeka, Kansas hometown to work up material for what would be the Leftoverture album, the band rehearsing in a vacant store in a strip mall the material Livgren was working up on a Lowrey organ at the parental home where he was staying. "Carry On Wayward Son" was written after the band had completed rehearsals. Livgren, who perceived the song as being "beamed down" to him in toto, in 2004 stated: "It's an autobiographical song. Parallel to my musical career I've always been on a spiritual sojourn, looking for truth and meaning. It was a song of self-encouragement. I was telling myself to keep on looking and I would find what I sought." Livgren was born again on July 25, 1979, and since 1980 recorded primarily as a Christian rock artist.

Drummer Phil Ehart recalled that Livgren mentioned a new song as Kansas was packing up to leave Topeka for Studio in the Country, the Louisiana facility where Leftoverture was recorded from December 1975, with Livgren presenting "Carry On Wayward Son" to his bandmates only after they had reached the studio.  According to Livgren "It was the last night we were in Topeka. I came into the studio on the last day and said, ‘I think you better hear this one’. The guys looked at each other and said, ‘We gotta do this’." In 2004, Ehart recalled, "It was the last, last [song] to be submitted for...'Leftoverture'...I can't even remember if we dropped something else to get [it] on there...[When] we recorded it, we didn't really think it would be a hit [as] it was about six minutes long...We were on the road [in December 1976 when] our manager...said: 'Well, you're not gonna believe this, but we actually have a hit song.' We said, 'What?' He said, 'Yeah. "Carry On Wayward Son" is shooting up the charts.' And it barely made it on the album!"

Kansas other guitarist Rich Williams indicated in 2004 that the success of "Carry On Wayward Son" was not a total surprise to the band: "As far as knowing what a hit was, we didn't have any idea. But we knew there was something special about ['Carry On Wayward Son']. It was very easy to listen to but still very different."

Release and impact
Subsequent to the October 21, 1976, release of the Leftoverture album, the track "Carry On Wayward Son" became an FM radio favorite, causing the November 23 single release of a 3:26 edit of the 5:26 album track (itself trimmed from 7:30 minutes). Many Top 40 stations aired the full album cut rather than the single edit.

Debuting at No. 86 on the Billboard Hot 100 dated December 25, 1976, "Carry On Wayward Son" reached the Top at seven weeks later, the single in its first months of release typically garnering attention in what could be termed secondary markets being "added" by major market radio stations such as WABC-AM (NYC) and KHJ-AM (LA) only in March 1977. Ultimately "Carry On Wayward Son" reached a chart peak of No. 11 on the Hot 100 dated April 2, 1977: Internationally the single reached No. 6 in Canada, No. 51 in the UK  and No. 58 in Australia  All initial releases of the single had a B-side of "Questions of My Childhood".

"Carry on Wayward Son" was later included on all Kansas compilation albums (except for Works in Progress) and was heard on all Kansas live albums. It was certified Gold by the RIAA for sales of 500,000 units on December 18, 1990, and reached quadruple platinum, or 4 million, on November 26, 2019. "Carry On Wayward Son" is 96th on VH1's 100 Greatest Hard Rock Songs.

Ultimate Classic Rock critic Eduardo Rivadavia rated "Carry On Wayward Son" as Kansas' greatest song, saying it "combines their progressive and commercial instincts" and "fluidly shifts between studied technique and an infectious melody, culminating in a soaring chorus."  Classic Rock critic Dave Ling also ranked it as Kansas' greatest song.

Personnel 

 Steve Walsh – lead vocals, keyboards, organ
 Robby Steinhardt – backing vocals
 Kerry Livgren – guitar, piano
 Rich Williams – acoustic and electric guitar
 Dave Hope – bass
 Phil Ehart – drums

Charts

Certifications

In other media
 "Carry On Wayward Son" is considered the unofficial theme song for the television series Supernatural. It is heard in the final episode of almost every season of the show, in "The Road So Far" synopses of previous episodes.
 The song was featured in the Season 11 episode of South Park, 'Guitar Queer-O', stemming from the songs inclusion in Guitar Hero II. The song is played multiple times throughout the episode. The song is also featured in the game Rock Band 2.
 It is used by the professional wrestling faction The Elite members The Young Bucks and Kenny Omega as their ring entrance music as of November 19, 2022 in All Elite Wrestling’s Full Gear (2022) Pay-per-view during their return challenging for the AEW World Trios Championship holders Death Triangle members PAC, Pentagón Jr, and Fénix to a title match.

Note

References

1976 singles
Gwar songs
Kansas (band) songs
Song recordings produced by Jeff Glixman
Songs written by Kerry Livgren